Clear Water Bay First Beach is a gazetted beach located in the northern part of Clear Water Bay in Clear Water Bay Peninsula, Sai Kung District, Hong Kong. The beach has barbecue pits and is managed by the Leisure and Cultural Services Department of the Hong Kong Government. The beach is 108 metres long and is rated as good to fair by the Environmental Protection Department for its water quality in the past twenty years. The first and second beaches are separated by a short stretch of rocky coast and interconnecting footpath.

History
On 13 June 1995, a 49-year-old woman Wong Kui-Yong had her left forearm and her left leg bitten off by a shark at the beach. She died of her injuries.

On 20 September 2020, a 37-year-old foreign woman fell into a coma on a yacht opposite the beach. She was pronounced dead after being sent to the hospital by a helicopter.

Usage
The beach tends to be smaller and is less frequently visited than the Clear Water Bay Second Beach.

Features
The beach has the following features:
 BBQ pits (15 nos.)
 Changing rooms
 Showers
 Toilets
 Water sports centre

See also
 Beaches of Hong Kong
 Tai Wan Tau, a nearby village located in the northeast of the beach

References

External links 

 Official website

Clear Water Bay Peninsula
Beaches of Hong Kong